French football club SC Bastia's 2005–06 season. Finished 6th place in league. Top scorer of the season, including 12 goals in 16 league matches have been Pierre-Yves André. Was eliminated to Coupe de France end of 16, the Coupe de la Ligue was able to be among the 1. tour.

Transfers

In 
Summer
 Yannick Cahuzac from Bastia B
 Pascal Camadini from Strasbourg
 Price Jolibois from Servette
 Florent Laville from Coventry City
 Grégory Lorenzi from Royal Mouscron-Péruwelz
 Arnaud Maire from Besançon
 Yohan Gomez from Lyon
 Eric Marester from Troyes
 Mounir Diane from Lens
 Christophe Meslin from Nice

Winter
 Serisay Barthélémy from free

Out 
Summer
 Alex Song to Arsenal
 Cédric Uras to Clermont
 Christian Karembeu to retired
 Anthar Yahia to Nice
 Tony Vairelles to Lierse
 Romain Rocchi and Stéphane Ziani to Ajaccio
 Djibril Sidibé to Châteauroux
 Youssouf Hadji to Rennes
 Sébastien Piocelle to Crotone
 Benjamin Longue to CA Bastia
 Pascal Chimbonda to Wigan Athletic

Winter
 No.

Squad

Ligue 2

League table

Results summary

Results by round

Matches

Coupe de France

Coupe de la Ligue

Statistics

Top scorers

League top assists

References 

SC Bastia seasons
Bastia